is a Japanese manga artist and illustrator, best known as the creator of Gunslinger Girl. Aida has also done the character designs for the eroge visual novel, Bittersweet Fools.

Works 
 Bittersweet Fools (character designs)
 Gunslinger Girl (May 2002 - September 2012, Dengeki Daioh)
 1518! (August 2014 - March 2019, Big Comic Spirits)
 The Valiant Must Fall (February 2021 – present. Young Animal)

References

External links 
 Yu Aida's Official Website 
 
 

Living people
Manga artists from Tochigi Prefecture
1977 births